Hippo Branch is a stream in Ralls County in the U.S. state of Missouri. It is a tributary of Spencer Creek. The stream headwaters arise just southeast of Missouri Route 19 (at ) and it flows east-southeast to its confluence with Spencer Creek one mile east of Madisonville (at ).

According to tradition, "hippo" is a contraction of "hypochondria"; the story continues Hippo Branch was so named on account of a hypochondriac in the area.

See also
List of rivers of Missouri

References

Rivers of Ralls County, Missouri
Rivers of Missouri